Pleasant Grove School may refer to:

Pleasant Grove School (Eden, Illinois), listed on the National Register of Historic Places in Peoria County, Illinois
Pleasant Grove School (Pleasant Grove, Utah), listed on the National Register of Historic Places in Utah County, Utah